University Santa Úrsula is a private university (Roman Catholic) in Rio de Janeiro, Brazil.

It was founded in 1937 by  Alceu Amoroso Lima. It was the first of Rio de Janeiro's higher education institutions to accept women. The main campus is located on the border of Flamengo, Laranjeiras, and Botafogo neighborhoods.

Notable alumni
Frida Baranek
Marcelo Crivella

External links 
 

1937 establishments in Brazil
Educational institutions established in 1937
Universities and colleges in Rio de Janeiro (city)
Catholic universities and colleges in Brazil